Bohorodchany raion was a district (raion) of the Ivano-Frankivsk Oblast in Ukraine. The urban-type settlement of Bohorodchany was the administrative center of the district. The raion was vaguely reminiscent with the Bohorodczan Powiat of the Stanisławów Voivodeship (1920 - 1932). The raion was abolished on 18 July 2020 as part of the administrative reform of Ukraine, which reduced the number of raions of Ivano-Frankivsk Oblast Oblast to six. The area of Bohorodchany Raion was merged into Ivano-Frankivsk Raion.

Geography
The district was located in the south-western part of the Ivano-Frankivsk Region (also known as Prykarpattia) stretching from its center towards peaks of the Carpathian Mountains that serve as a natural border between Prykarpattia and Zakarpattia. To the west of the district was located the Rozhniativ district, to the north - Kalush, north-east - Tysmenytsia, south-east - Nadvirna. The Bohorodchany district also had a small border with the Zakarpattia Region.

The physical geography of the district was not the same and was divided into three landscape zones: plains, piedmont (foothills), mountains. The highest peak was the mountain Syvulia  which was located on the border of Bohorodchany and Rozhniativ districts and is part of Gorgany mountainous system. Two major rivers that flow through the area are Bystrytsias of Solotvyn and Nadvirna.

In the middle of the Carpathian Gorgany was located a botanic reserve "Skete of Manyava" known as a local arboretum which contains selection of Larix decidua. Near the village of Starunya is located a unique mud volcano.

Administrative divisions
At the time of disestablishment, the raion consisted of four hromadas:
 Bohorodchany settlement hromada with the administration in Bohorodchany;
 Dzvyniach rural hromada with the administration in the selo of Dzvyniach;
 Solotvyn settlement hromada with the administration in the urban-type settlement of Solotvyn;
 Stari Bohorodchany rural hromada with the administration in the selo of Stari Bohorodchany.

The raion was divided into 32 municipalities: two - urban, 30 - rural. Within the district were located 41 settlements and no cities. All municipalities are named after their administrative centers and may include other settlements within their territories.

<div style="padding:1em 20px 1em 20px; color:#000000;text-align:left;">

Government

The government in the district was headed by the chairman of the district state administration (governor) appointed by the President of Ukraine. The governor appointed his deputies forming his regional governing cabinet to supervise the government policies in the region. Aside of the state administration the region had its own council that is headed by its chairman. The composition of the council depends on the popular vote in the region, while the chairman is elected within the elected council.
Regional State Administration
The District State Administration (BRDA) consisted of the chairman, his deputies (3), and secretary who headed the supporting "aparat" of the administration. Within the administration were numerous departments, each of them headed by a chief of department. The Bohorodchany District State Administration had 13 departments and other government institutions such as the Children Service, regional state archives, and others.
Chairman: Volodymyr Yefimchuk (Party of Regions)

District council

Chairman: Mykhailo Holovchuk (Svoboda)

Transportation
The districts infrastructure was poorly developed, however there were several highway routes passing through it.
Main Highways
  traveling from Ivano-Frankivsk to Nadvirna the highway passes through the town of Bohorodchany heading further to Yaremche.
 , an exclusive highway that is completely within the district and runs from Bohorodchany to the village of Stara Huta in Carpathians.
 , a regional route Rozhniativ-Kosmach-Nadvirna that connects the district with its neighbors.

Mass media
There is a district newspaper "Voice of People" (Slovo Narodu) and one radio station "Source" (Dzherelo).

Tourist attractions
Museum Fund
 Historic-Regional Museum of Fedanyk (Solotvyn)
 History Museum of the Forest Factory (Dzvynyach)
 Museum of ethnography and traditions of the village (Sadzhava)
 Museum of Nature (Manyava)
 Historic-Architecture Museum (Maniava Monastery-Skete)
Government Protected areas
 National Landmark of Architecture (1690) Monastery-Skete Complex, Manyava, Protection# 239 (included Over-gate Tower 239/1, Treasury 239/2, Defense Tower and walls 239/3, Refectory 239/4, Foundations of Zdvyzhenska Church 239/5)
 National Landmark of Architecture (1832, wooden) Church of Nativity of Jesus, Pidhir'ya, Protection# 1141 (includes Church 1141/1 and its belfry 1141/2)
 National Landmark of Archeology "Multi-layers Settlement Starunia-1" (Bronze Age, Neolithic)
 National Landmark of Architecture (1762) Dominican Monastery Complex, Bohorodchany, Protection# 234 (included Kosciol 234/1, Chamber-cells of Clergy 234/2, Wall with a gate 234/3)
Local Landmarks
There are 15 archeological sites near the village of Starunia that identified as local Landmarks, three more sites are near the village of Hrabovets. There are also archeological landmarks near the villages of Horokholyna, Manyava, and Molodkiv.
 Local Landmark of Nature "Manyava waterfall"
 Botanic Reserve "Skete of Manyava"
 Building of People's Court, 20th century (Bohorodchany) Protection# 606
 Synagogue, 18th century (Solotvyn) Protection# 631
 Church of Nativity of the Theotokos, 1904 wooden (Solotvyn) Protection# 632 and its belfry (Protection# 633)
 Church of Saint Taxiarch Archangel Michael, 1805 wooden (Babche) Protection# 607
 Church of Nativity of the Theotokos, 1810 wooden (Bohrivka) Protection# 608 and its belfry (Protection# 609)
 Church of Saint Nicolas, 1875 wooden (Hlybivka) Protection# 610
 Church of Resurrection of Christ, 1856 wooden (Hrabovets) Protection# 611
 Church of Lord's Levitation, 1860 wooden (Hrynivka) Protection# 612
 Church of Saint Demetrius, 1868 wooden (Kosmach) Protection# 614/1 and its belfry (Protection# 614/2)
 Watermill, 19th century wooden (Kosmach) Protection# 615
 Smith shop, 1896 wooden (Kosmach) Protection# 616
 Church of Saint Taxiarch Archangel Michael, 1862 wooden (Kryvets) Protection# 619
 Church of Saint Paraskevi of Serbia, 1820 wooden (Krychka) Protection# 617 and its belfry (Protection# 618)
 Church of Saint Apostles Paul and Peter, 1862 wooden (Lesivka) Protection# 620
 Church of Immaculate Conception of Virgin Mary, 1775 wooden (Lukvytsia) Protection# 521
 Church of Protection of the Theotokos, 1819 wooden (Manyava) Protection# 622
 Church of Saint John the Baptist, 1846 wooden (Markova) Protection# 623
 Church of Saint Nicolas, 19th century wooden (Pidhir'ya) Protection# 624
 Church of Saint Taxiarch Archangel Michael, 1848 wooden (Rosilna) Protection# 625 and its belfry (Protection# 626)
 Mine well, 16th century (Rosilna) Protection# 627
 Church of Saint Taxiarch Archangel Michael (at cemetery), 1776 wooden (Rosilna) Protection# 628
 Church of Nativity of the Theotokos, 1863 wooden (Stari Bohorodchany) Protection# 629
 Church of Resurrection of Christ, 1926 wooden (Stari Bohorodchany) Protection# 630

Personalities
 Mykhailo Petrushevych (1869–1895), a Ukrainian writer
 Oleksiy Zaklynsky (1819–1881), a Ukrainian writer
 Ivan Kapushchak (1807–1868), a deputy to the Austrian Imperial Parliament
 Modest Sosenko (1875–1920), a Ukrainian artist
 Mykhailo Yatskiv (1873–1961), a Ukrainian writer
 Mykhailo Martynets, a minister of Land Affairs for the government of the West Ukrainian People's Republic
Writers who commemorated their work to the region
 Antin Mohylnytsky (1811–1873), a Ukrainian poet, a Greek-Catholic priest
 Yulian Tselvych (1843–1892), a Ukrainian historian and pedagogue

References

External links
 List of National Landmarks in Ivano-Frankivsk Region
 Internet-resource for Cultural Heritage in Ukraine
 List of National Landmarks in Bohorodchany Raion

Former raions of Ivano-Frankivsk Oblast
1940 establishments in the Soviet Union
Ukrainian raions abolished during the 2020 administrative reform